Akhund Mahalleh may refer to:
 Akhund Mahalleh, Ardabil
 Akhund Mahalleh, Gilan
 Akhund Mahalleh, Mazandaran